Rajkumar Ranbir Singh (1930 – 27 January 2006) also known as R. K. Ranbir Singh was a former Chief Minister of Manipur, India. He belonged to Manipur Peoples Party and Manipur royal family. He was the Chief Minister of Manipur from 1990 to 1992. He was elected to the Manipur Legislative Assembly from Keishamthong in the 1990 Manipur Legislative Assembly election as a member of the Manipur Peoples Party.

He introduced the Manipur Liquor Prohibition Act 1991, which banned the liquor in the state of Manipur. He joined Bharatiya Janata Party along with P. Rathin.

He died on 27 January 2006 after a prolonged illness.

References

1930 births
2006 deaths
Manipur MLAs 1990–1995
Bharatiya Janata Party politicians from Manipur
Indian National Congress politicians from Manipur
People from Manipur
Chief Ministers of Manipur
20th-century Indian politicians
Manipur Peoples Party politicians
Manipur MLAs 1995–2000